Mahdi Dashti (born 26 October 2001) is a Kuwaiti professional soccer player who plays as a right back for  Al-Salmiya.

References

External links

2001 births
Living people
Kuwaiti footballers
Kuwait international footballers
Association football defenders
Kuwait Premier League players
Al Salmiya SC players
Kuwaiti people of Iranian descent